The Donetsk–Krivoy Rog Soviet Republic or Donetsk–Kryvyi Rih Soviet Republic was a self-declared Soviet republic of the Russian SFSR proclaimed on 12 February 1918. It was founded three days after the government of the Ukrainian People's Republic (UPR) signed its Treaty of Brest-Litovsk with the Central Powers, which recognised the borders of the UPR. Lenin did not support the creation of the entity and neither did Sverdlov. Some other Bolsheviks like Elena Stasova, however, sent a telegraph of best wishes.

The Donetsk–Krivoy Rog Soviet Republic claimed the territories south of the neighbouring Ukrainian People's Republic, including the Donbas, Kharkiv, Yekaterinoslav, and part of the Kherson Governorates. In the beginning, the republic's capital was the city of Kharkiv, but later with the retreat of the Red Guard it moved to Luhansk. The newly created government challenged the authority of the General Secretariat of Ukraine and the People's Secretariat. Some of the commissars held positions as secretaries in another Bolshevik government in Ukraine, the People's Secretariat.

The Donetsk–Krivoy Rog Soviet Republic was disbanded at the second All-Ukrainian Congress of Soviets on 20 March 1918 when the independence of Soviet Ukraine was announced. The Donetsk–Krivoy Rog Soviet Republic failed to achieve recognition, either internationally or by the Russian SFSR, and in accordance with the March 1918 second Treaty of Brest-Litovsk was abolished.

The Donetsk–Krivoy Rog Soviet Republic was invoked during the war in Donbas (started 2014), when the legislature of the unrecognised separatist Donetsk People's Republic (DPR) adopted a memorandum on 5 February 2015 declaring itself the successor to the Donetsk–Krivoy Rog Soviet Republic, and Artyom as founding father.

Government 
Chairman – Fyodor Sergeyev ("Artyom")
People's Commissariat for Internal Affairs – S. Vasilchenko
People's Commissariat for Financial Affairs – Valeriy Mezhlauk
People's Commissariat for Labour – B. Magidov
People's Commissariat for National Enlightenment – M. Zhakov
People's Commissariat for Legal Affairs – V. Filov
People's Commissariat for Military Affairs – Moisei Rukhimovich
People's Commissariat for State Control – A. Kamensky

After a government crisis and resignation of Vasilchenko, Zhakov and Filov on 29 March 1918, the Sovnarkom relocated from Kharkiv to Luhansk.

Chairman – Fyodor Sergeyev ("Artyom")
Deputy Chairman – Yu. Lutovinov ("Ivan")
People's Commissariat for Internal Affairs – I. Yakimovich
People's Commissariat for Finance – Valeriy Mezhlauk
People's Commissariat for Labour – B. Magidov
People's Commissariat for Enlightenment – Ya. Istomin
People's Commissariat for Justice – A. Chervyakov
People's Commissariat for Provision – I. Alekseyev ("Koom")
People's Commissariat for Military Affairs – Moisei Rukhimovich
People's Commissariat for State Control – A. Kamensky
People's Commissariat for Posts and Telegraphs – Innokentiy Kozhevnikov
People's Commissariat for Public Property –  A. Puzyryov
Director of Sovnarkom Affairs – A. Povzner

See also 
 Novorossiya
 Russians in Ukraine
 Crimean Khanate
 Sloboda Ukraine
 People's Secretariat
 New Russia

Notes

References

External links 
 Donets–Kryvyi Rih Soviet Republic, article from the Encyclopedia of Ukraine
 
 Infodon: DKR prehistory — Formation of the DKR — End of the DKR 
 Ukrainian SSR (at narod.ru) 
 Hrabovskiy, Serhiy And again the "PISUAR". Newspaper Den. 8 April 2014. 

Ukraine in the Russian Civil War
Early Soviet republics
Former socialist republics
1918 in Ukraine
Subdivisions of the Russian Soviet Federative Socialist Republic
Communism in Ukraine
Political history of Ukraine
Donbas
History of Kryvyi Rih
History of Kharkiv Oblast
History of Luhansk Oblast
History of Donetsk Oblast
History of Kharkiv
Russian irredentism
1918 establishments in Ukraine
1918 disestablishments in Ukraine
States and territories established in 1918
States and territories disestablished in 1918
Post–Russian Empire states